Compsodrillia albonodosa is a species of sea snail, a marine gastropod mollusk in the family Pseudomelatomidae, the turrids and allies.

Description
The length of the shell varies between 13 mm and 20 mm.

Distribution
This species occurs in the Pacific Ocean off Mazatlan, Mexico.

References

External links
 
 

albonodosa
Gastropods described in 1857
Taxa named by Philip Pearsall Carpenter